Pescate is a comune (municipality) in the Province of Lecco in the Italian region Lombardy, located about  northeast of Milan and about  south of Lecco.

The municipality of Pescate contains the frazioni (subdivisions, mainly villages and hamlets) Pescalina, Insirano, Torrette Inferiori, and Torrette Superiori.

Pescate borders the following municipalities: Galbiate, Garlate, Lecco.

Demographic evolution

References

External links 
 www.comune.pescate.lc.it/

Cities and towns in Lombardy